Olivaceous warbler can refer to one of two bird species, formerly regarded as conspecific:

 Western olivaceous warbler Hippolais opaca
 Eastern olivaceous warbler Hippolais pallida

Animal common name disambiguation pages